Vanđel Dimitrijević Skopljanče (Skopje, 1875–1915) was a Serbian Chetnik Vojovode (Duke) in Old Serbia from the time of the struggle for Macedonia in the early 20th century.

Biography  
He was born in Skopje in 1875. He was a VMRO comita before 1903 and participated in the Ilinden Uprising. After the founding of the Serbian Chetnik organization in 1903, he joined as Vojvoda and organized a company (ćeta). He was active in Kumanovo and Preševo region from 1903 to 1905. After 1905, he was withdrawn from the field along with six others (Rista Starački, Jovan Dovezenski, Vladimir Kovačević, Trenko Rujanović, Emilio Milutinović and Jovan Pešić) and stripped of his rank for insubordination by the Serbian Chetnik Organization. In the First Balkan War, he was again deployed in Chetnik detachments, participating in all 1912 battles led by Vojvoda Vuk, and the Volunteer Detachment in the Second Balkan War of 1913. In the First World War, he fought in Chetnik detachments from the beginning of the conflict (1914). He died at Bitola in late 1915, defending the Serbian Army's retreat over the Albanian mountains.

See also
 List of Chetnik voivodes

References 
 P. D. S. Jerinić, Vojvode iz četničke akcije u Staroj Srbiji i Maćedoniji 1903–1912, Dobrovoljački glasnik, br. 32, Beograd 2008, 42-43.

Chetniks
1875 births
1915 deaths